Julia Koschitz (born 26 December 1974) is an Austrian actress. She has appeared in more than forty films since 2005.

Selected filmography

References

External links 

1974 births
Living people
Austrian film actresses